Equalization payments are cash payments made in some federal systems of government from the federal government to subnational governments with the objective of offsetting differences in available revenue or in the cost of providing services. Many federations use fiscal equalisation to reduce the inequalities in the fiscal capacities of sub-national governments arising from the differences in their geography, demography, natural endowments and economies. The level of equalisation sought can vary, however.

The payments are generally calculated based on the magnitude of the subnational "fiscal gap": essentially the difference between fiscal need and fiscal capacity. Fiscal capacity and fiscal need are not equivalent to measures of fiscal revenue and expenditure, as making them so would induce perverse incentives to subnational governments to reduce fiscal effort.

Australia

Australia introduced a formal system of horizontal fiscal equalisation (HFE) in 1933 to compensate states/territories which have a lower capacity to raise revenue. The objective is full equalisation which means that, after HFE, each of the six states, the Australian Capital Territory and the Northern Territory would have the capacity to provide services and the associated infrastructure at the same standard, if each state/territory made the same effort to raise revenue from its own sources and operated at the same level of efficiency.

Currently the funds distributed to achieve HFE are the revenues raised from the Goods and Services Tax (GST), currently about AUD 50 bn a year. The distribution of GST required to achieve HFE is decided by the Federal Treasurer each year, on the basis of advice provided by the Commonwealth Grants Commission (CGC).

Achieving HFE does not mean that the states are directed how to raise revenue or how to spend their funds. GST revenue grants from the Commonwealth are unencumbered and available for any purpose. Accordingly, HFE equalises fiscal capacity, not fiscal policies which remain for the states to decide for themselves. It does not result in the same level of services or taxes in all states, direct that the states must achieve any specified level of service in any area, nor impose actual budget outcomes in accordance with the commission's calculations.

Belgium
The only mechanism designed to reduce fiscal disparities between the federated entities in Belgium is a program called the National Solidarity Intervention ( (NSB);  (ISN)). Under the program, regions in which the average per capita yield of personal income tax falls below the national average are entitled to an unconditional transfer from the federal government.

The amount paid to each region reflects the gap in the yield of personal income tax in the region in relation to the national average, weighted by an indexing factor and a factor pertaining to the amounts received by beneficiaries when the system was introduced. Their inferior fiscal capacity causes the Brussels and Walloon regions to be recipients of NSB/ISN transfers. The region of Flanders does not receive funding under the program, as its fiscal capacity lies above the national average.

Canada

In Canada, the Government of Canada makes payments to less wealthy Canadian provinces to equalize the provinces' "fiscal capacity"—their ability to generate tax revenues. In 2009–2010, six provinces received $14.2 billion in equalization payments from the federal government.
Until the 2009-2010 fiscal year, Ontario was the only province to have never received equalization payments.

Canada's territories are not included in the equalization program - the federal government addresses territorial fiscal needs through the Territorial Formula Financing (TFF) program.

Equalization payments are based on a formula that calculates the difference between the per capita revenue yield that a particular province would obtain using average tax rates and the national average per capita revenue yield at average tax rates.  The current formula considers five major revenue sources (see below).  The objective of the program is to ensure that all provinces have access to per capita revenues equal to the potential average of all ten provinces.  The formula is based solely on revenues and does not consider the cost of providing services or the expenditure need of the provinces.

Equalization payments do not, technically, involve wealthy provinces making payments to poor provinces, although in practice this is what happens, via the federal treasury. As an example, a wealthy citizen in New Brunswick, a so-called "have not" province, pays more into equalization than a poorer citizen in Alberta, a so-called "have" province. However, because of Alberta's greater wealth, the citizens of Alberta as a whole are net contributors to Equalization, while the citizens of New Brunswick are net receivers of Equalization payments.

Equalization payments are one example of what are often collectively referred to in Canada as "transfer payments", a term used in other jurisdictions to refer to cash payments to individuals (see Canadian Transfer Payments). In fact, there are four types of federal transfers to provinces and territories: the Canada Health Transfer (CHT), the Canada Social Transfer (CST), Equalization, and Territorial Formula Financing (TFF). Moreover, the federal government has entered into particular arrangements with certain provinces – Nova Scotia and Newfoundland and Labrador, in particular – under which offset payments are made to the governments of these provinces for the development of offshore oil and gas reserves.

The money the provinces receive through equalization can be spent in any way the provincial government desires. The payments help guarantee "reasonably comparable levels" of health care, education, and welfare in all the provinces. The definition of "reasonably comparable levels", however, has been the subject of considerable debate.

In 2009–2010, the total amount of the program was roughly  billion.

Recent negotiations surrounding the renewal of the program have created considerable tension among provinces.  Due to the zero-sum nature of the formula, increases in entitlements for some provinces necessarily lead to decreases for others.

France

Article 72-2 of the French constitution (amended 28 March 2003) created the obligation of the state to promote equality between regional bodies (regions and municipalities). That is achieved by direct tax collection by local government (Taxe professionelle) and grants from central government. Direct financing by the state amounted to 28% of revenues in 2011, devolved tax revenues account for 60% of revenues, and debt accounted for the remainder.

Germany

According to Section 8 of the Weimar Constitution, taxation became a matter of the federal government in 1919 and the states lost their ability to generate income. Thus, the state tax law of 1920 supplied for equalization payments among the states which ensured that no state would have less than 80% of the average state tax revenue.
Sections 106 and 107 of the Constitution of the Federal Republic of Germany supply for the distribution of tax revenues (horizontal and vertical equalization). This includes reducing the revenues of richer states in favour of the poorer ones. In 2015 this amounted to the re-distribution of 9.594 billion Euros from the states of Bavaria, Baden-Württemberg, Hesse and Hamburg to all the other states.

Switzerland
The first elements of an equalization system in Switzerland were introduced in 1938 in the form of conditional grants, which varied according to the tax capacity of the cantons.  In 1958, a constitutional article gave the federal government the authority to equalize fiscal disparities. Christopher Hengan-Braun, a Swiss economist, was the main source of guidance in 1958 for the federal government to help balance Switzerland's fiscal disparities.

United Kingdom

See also
 Fiscal imbalance
 Fiscal federalism

References

External links

General
The Design of Equalization Grants: Theory and Applications (World Bank Institute)

Canada
Maple Leaf Web: Equalization Program in Canada: Overview and Contemporary Issues
Department of Finance: Equalization Program
A Strong Ontario for a Stronger Canada
Expert Panel on Equalization and Territorial Formula Financing
Canadian Governments Compared

Australia
Commonwealth Grants Commission

Public economics
Fiscal federalism
Taxation and redistribution
Payments

de:Länderfinanzausgleich